Robert H. Hunt (1839 – 1908) fought for the Union Army during the American Civil War and was elected mayor of  Kansas City, Missouri in 1872.

Biography
Hunt was born in  County Kerry, Ireland in 1839. His parents emigrated to the United States in 1847, taking their children with them. At the age of eight, Robert began to work as a waterboy on the railroad. At seventeen he entered Canandaigua Academy, Canandaigua, New York. 

In 1859, Hunt headed west and ended up in Kansas City. Anti-slavery as he was, he lived on the Kansas side of the state line, where he engaged in farming. That same year, he married Miss Nellie Hoyne.  With the outbreak of the Civil War in 1861, Hunt joined the Union Army as a private. He served for four years and eight months, moving up through the ranks, and eventually ending his service as a colonel.

During the war he was involved in many battles.   Major Hunt directed the charge at the Battle of Mine Creek when Confederate General John S. Marmaduke was captured and Confederate General Sterling Price was defeated.  Additionally, Major Hunt served as Chief of Artillery under General Samuel Curtis at the Battle of Westport and was wounded by "being hit in the head by a piece of an exploding Confederate shell."  For his contributions during this battle, Major Hunt was breveted lieutenant colonel. 

In 1872, Colonel Hunt was elected the mayor of Kansas City, Missouri, serving one year. From 1874 to 1878, Colonel Hunt served on the Kansas City School Board.  He died in 1908.

Footnotes
1. United States Biographical Dictionary and Portrait Gallery of Eminent and Self-Made Men. Missouri Volume. New York, NY, USA: United States Biographical Publishing, 1878, pp 20–21.
2. Paul Burrill Jenkins: The Battle of Westport, 1906, p 58.
3. Carrie Westlake Whitney: Kansas City, Missouri, Its History and People, 1808-1908. Chicago, The S.J. Clarke Publishing Co. 1908, p 200.

1839 births
1908 deaths
Mayors of Kansas City, Missouri